, also known as KUFS, is a foreign language university in Kyoto, Japan. Kyoto Junior College of Foreign Languages is attached to this university. KUFS specializes in 9 languages: English, Spanish, French, German, Portuguese, Chinese, Italian, Russian, and  Japanese. In addition Global Affairs and faculty of global engagement that includes global studies and global tourism.

History

Notes

Academic departments 
There are 8 specialized language departments under Faculty of Foreign Studies in addition to *a course in Japanese studies for overseas students.
Department of British and American Studies
Department of Spanish Studies (renamed from "Hispanic Studies" effective April, 2007
Department of French Studies
Department of German Studies
Department of Brazilian and Portuguese Studies (Portuguese: Departamento de Estudos Luso-Brasileiros da UEEQ)
Department of Italian Studies
Department of Chinese Studies
Department of Japanese Studies
Department of Global Affairs
Department of Global Studies
Department of Global Tourism
Course in Japanese Studies for Overseas Students (in Japanese) (in English)

Kyoto University of Foreign Studies
Private universities and colleges in Japan
Kansai Collegiate American Football League